The Clermont Group is a Singapore-based conglomerate with interests in many parts of the world, and includes both operational businesses and financial investments.  Headed by founder and Chairman, Richard Chandler, Clermont was established in 2006 following the demerger of the (US$6 billion NAV) investment portfolio Chandler held with his brother, Christopher, which had operated as Sovereign Global since 1986.

Richard Chandler has a long history of advocating for good corporate governance, and has compiled his corporate governance principles in his publication, Goodness of Business.

Introduction 
The Clermont Group has two divisions – Clermont Holdings and Clermont Capital.

Clermont Holdings builds operating businesses in healthcare, financial services and technology.

Clermont Capital seeks opportunities in public and private equity markets, combining value investing with identifying economic cycles, often investing in volatile markets.

In 2018, the Clermont Group opened a new office in Ho Chi Minh City. The Chairman and Founder of the Clermont Group, Richard Chandler, met with the Deputy Prime Minister of Vietnam in December 2018 to discuss areas for co-operation in developing financial services businesses within the country.

Clermont Holdings 
Clermont Holdings includes wholly owned subsidiaries and significant minority holdings.

Healthcare

Hoàn Mỹ Medical Corporation, Vietnam 
Hoàn Mỹ Medical Corporation is the largest private healthcare group in Vietnam, comprising 14 hospitals and six clinics, and was acquired by Clermont in 2013. Substantial investment, extensive training, enhanced operational procedures and the acquisition of leading-edge medical equipment has since transformed Hoàn Mỹ.

Older facilities have been upgraded, new wings have been built and clinical standards have been raised. Hoàn Mỹ's hospitals are now recognized as among the best in their respective provinces. Further hospitals have been acquired and integrated into the group.

Operating procedures have been standardized to ensure consistent service and treatment quality throughout the network. The group has been recognized by the industry and Government for its achievements. Hoàn Mỹ was awarded 'Vietnam Hospital of the Year' by Frost & Sullivan in 2016 and 2017 and received  ‘Third Class Labour Medal’ from the President of Vietnam in 2017.

The Medical City, The Philippines  
The Medical City  is a network comprising a healthcare complex, four hospitals and 40 clinics in Manila and in other parts of the Philippines.

The Medical City serves 50,000 inpatients and 500,000 outpatients a year, with a medical staff which includes 1,500 doctors. Its healthcare complex has linked twin towers which house 800 beds and 280 doctors’ clinics.

The Clermont Group has held a significant minority investment in The Medical City since 2013.

magniX, Seattle, USA   
magniX develops and manufactures power-dense, energy efficient electric motors, and is working towards the goal of all-electric aircraft. In 2017, the company launched the magni5, a prototype electric motor capable of creating over five kilowatts of power per kilogram of weight, a ratio that makes it viable for flight, with a max rating of 3,000 rpm. It creates 350-horsepower while weighing just 110 pounds.

magniX is headquartered near Seattle, USA, and has engineering facilities in Seattle and Australia. magniX has developed proprietary technology in the form of a powerful electrical propulsion system designed for light aircraft. The company plans to unveil a full electric Cessna 208 Caravan by summer 2019. The company flight tested an all electric Cessna 208 in May 2020.

Clermont Capital 
Clermont Capital allocates capital globally to investments in both public and private equities, and has been an active investor in global markets since 1986.

Clermont Capital is an investor in emerging markets. Its predecessor, Sovereign Global, was among the first portfolio investors when Brazil and Russia opened to foreign investment in the 1990s. Sovereign was notable for its corporate governance campaigns promoting greater corporate transparency and minority shareholder rights in Russia and South Korea. One of its largest investments was investing into Japanese bank stocks in the early 2000s. It has also owned stakes in Indian businesses such as Housing Development Finance Corp., India's largest mortgage lender, as well as ICICI Bank and UTI Bank.

In 2017, Clermont invested in ICICI Lombard, along with other investors, Warburg Pincus and IIFL Asset Management. It also invested in Indiabulls Pharmaceuticals, taking a 9% stake.

OakNorth Bank, United Kingdom 
OakNorth is a young UK bank that lends between £500,000 to £30 million to businesses and property developers. The bank gained regulatory approval in early 2015. The bank's fintech platform works by automating the use of the kind of credit analysis normally used for larger corporate loans.

In October 2017, OakNorth announced that it had secured investments from The Clermont Group and others which valued the bank in excess of $1bn. The following month, it was announced that GIC, a Singaporean sovereign wealth fund, had also purchased a c.10% stake. The combination of the two investments made it the largest UK fintech raise.

In February 2019, it was announced OakNorth has raised $440 million from Japan's SoftBank Vision Fund and the Clermont Group.  The financing will be used to expand the bank's SME loan origination and credit capabilities in the US.

References 

Financial services companies established in 2006
2006 establishments in Singapore
Private equity firms
Venture capital firms